Newport News station is an Amtrak intercity train station in Newport News, Virginia. The station is the southern terminus of two daily Northeast Regional round trips. It has a single side platform adjacent to a large CSX rail yard. An Amtrak Thruway motorcoach connection to Norfolk station effectively doubles the frequency between each station and Washington.

A replacement station near Newport News/Williamsburg International Airport is under construction, with opening expected in April 2024. A second station in downtown Newport News is also proposed.

History

Chesapeake & Ohio

The Chesapeake and Ohio Railroad (C&O) under Collis Potter Huntington completed the Peninsula Extension to the small town of Newport News in 1881. This allowed the C&O to transport West Virginia coal to Hampton Roads – the largest warm-water port on the East Coast – and directly compete with the Norfolk and Western Railway. Between the coal exports and Huntington's Newport News Shipbuilding Company, Newport News soon became a major shipping and industrial area.

Ferry service between Norfolk and Newport News began in 1883, though the first passenger train station at Newport News was not built until 1892. The multi-story brick structure, Victorian with a large clock tower, was built on the waterfront at 23rd Street. A train shed stretched onto a pier so that passengers could transfer directly between trains and ferries.

By the 1930s, the station was in poor shape, having settled significantly due to the soft soil. It was demolished in 1940 and replaced with a smaller two-story brick station.

Between 1953 and 1954, the C&O stopped using Phoebus, Virginia to the east as the terminus of its Norfolk/Hampton Roads area passenger trains. The company shifted that terminus, by then being for the George Washington and other passenger trains, to Newport News station.

When Amtrak took over intercity passenger service in the United States on May 1, 1971, the C&O had served Newport News with three daily round trips: the Newport News sections of the George Washington and Fast Flying Virginian/Sportsman, plus a Newport News-Richmond trip.

Amtrak

Amtrak kept only one daily round trip to Newport News – a section of the Newport News-Cincinnati George Washington. It was combined with the James Whitcomb Riley on July 12, 1971, to provide through service to Chicago. The George Washington name was used for the eastbound section until May 19, 1974. On June 14, 1976, the Newport News section of the Riley was replaced with the Washington-Newport News Colonial.

Ferry service had been replaced by buses through the Hampton Roads Bridge–Tunnel upon its 1957 opening, making the waterfront location less desirable for a train station.  The station was moved to its current location along the CSX line in October 1981.   The 1940-built station remains standing and now serves as a restaurant.

Service was reduced to one daily round trip from 2020 to July 11, 2022.

Future

The current facility was planned to be replaced with two new stations—a large intermodal station near the Newport News/Williamsburg International Airport and a smaller station in downtown Newport News. The city planned to begin design work for the larger station in the summer of 2011, for an opening sometime before 2016. As of 2011, the cost was estimated at $24 million. As of 2019, the project was further delayed, until 2021, with plans for a new downtown station dropped and the intermodal station to serve as the new terminus.

Construction for the new intermodal station near the airport began in July 2020. The project will cost $47 million and was originally expected to be completed by the summer of 2022. However, the city of Newport News announced in October 2022 that the new station would not be open until the fall of 2023, citing unexpected construction delays. In March 2023, a further delay to April 2024 due to supply chain issues was announced.

A third Northeast Regional weekday round trip is planned, as of 2020, under a major spending initiative by the Virginia Department of Rail and Public Transportation.

References

External links 

Newport News Amtrak Station (USA Rail Guide – Train Web)
The Train Station

Transportation in Newport News, Virginia
Amtrak stations in Virginia
Amtrak Thruway Motorcoach stations in Virginia
Buildings and structures in Newport News, Virginia